Hendy Rugby Football Club is a rugby union team from the village of Hendy in West Wales. The club is a member of the Welsh Rugby Union and is a feeder club for the Llanelli Scarlets.

Notable former players
David Idwell Davies (1 cap)
  Ruadhri Guilfoyle (31 cap)
Dai Hiddlestone (5 caps)
Bryn Howells (1 cap)

References

Welsh rugby union teams
Rugby clubs established in 1893
Sport in Llanelli
1893 establishments in Wales